The 2022 IIHF World U18 Championship was the 23rd such event hosted by the International Ice Hockey Federation. Teams will participate at several levels of competition. The competition also served as qualifications for the 2023 competition. On 28 February the IIHF "suspended all Russian and Belarusian National Teams and Clubs from participation in every age category and in all IIHF competitions or events until further notice", which resulted in a reformating of the tournament. Due to the suspensions there are two open spots in the top division, two teams can be promoted for 2023 and no team will be relegated. Additionally, all eight teams will qualify for the QF round and will be reseeded according to their tournament ranking.

Sweden won their second world championship by beating USA in the final with score 6–4. Finland won bronze by beating Czechia in the bronze medal game with score 4–1.

Top Division
The tournament was held from 23 April to 1 May 2022 in Landshut and Kaufbeuren, Germany.

Seeding
Due to the suspension of Russia and Belarus, the groups were reseeded.

Original Seeding

Group A (Kaufbeuren)
 (1)
 (4)
 (5)
 (8)
 (9)

Group B (Landshut)
 (2)
 (3)
 (6)
 (7)
 (10)

Updated Seeding

Group A (Landshut)
 (1)
 (5)
 (7)
 (10)

Group B (Kaufbeuren)
 (3)
 (4)
 (8)
 (9)

Preliminary round
All times are local (UTC+2).

Group A

Group B

Playoff round
Winning teams will be reseeded in accordance with the following ranking:

higher position in the group
higher number of points
better goal difference
higher number of goals scored for
better seeding coming into the tournament (final placement at the 2021 IIHF World U18 Championships).

Bracket

Quarterfinals

Semifinals

Bronze medal game

Gold medal game

Final standings

Statistics

Scoring leaders 

GP = Games played; G = Goals; A = Assists; Pts = Points; +/− = Plus–minus; PIM = Penalties In MinutesSource: IIHF

Goaltending leaders 

(minimum 40% team's total ice time)

TOI = Time on ice (minutes:seconds); GA = Goals against; GAA = Goals against average; SA = Shots against; Sv% = Save percentage; SO = ShutoutsSource: IIHF

Division I

Group A
The tournament was played in Piešťany, Slovakia from 11 to 17 April 2022.

Group B
The tournament was played in Asiago, Italy from 25 April to 1 May 2022.

Division II

Group A
The tournament was played in Tallinn, Estonia from 3 to 9 April 2022.

Group B
The tournament was played in Sofia, Bulgaria from  21 to 24 March 2022.

Division III

Group A
The tournament was played in Istanbul, Turkey from 11 to 17 April 2022.

Group B
The tournament was played in Sarajevo, Bosnia and Herzegovina from 17 to 22 April 2022.

References 

 
2022 in ice hockey
IIHF World U18 Championships
International ice hockey competitions hosted by Germany
2021–22 in German ice hockey
Sports competitions in Bavaria
IIHF World U18 Championships
IIHF World U18 Championships
Sports events affected by the 2022 Russian invasion of Ukraine